Lakeshore is an unincorporated community in Fresno County, California. It is located on the north shore of Huntington Lake, at an elevation of 6995 feet (2132 m).

The first Lakeshore post office opened in 1924.

References

Unincorporated communities in California
Unincorporated communities in Fresno County, California